Ralph Burton (fl. 1322-1340), was an English Member of Parliament.

He was a Member (MP) of the Parliament of England for Leicester in 1322 and 1340.

References

Year of birth missing
14th-century deaths
14th-century English people
People from Lewes
Members of the Parliament of England (pre-1707)